Ingigarth of Sweden - Swedish: Ingegärd or Ingegerd - may refer to:

Ingegerd of Norway or Ingigarth, Swedish queen consort 1096
Ingegerd Birgersdotter of Bjelbo, Swedish queen consort 1200
Ingegerd Olofsdotter of Sweden, Swedish princess 1001
Ingigarth, Swedish princess (died 1204), daughter of King Sweartgar I, abbess